Following Russia's invasion of Ukraine beginning on 24 February 2022, the United States, the European Union, and other Western countries introduced or significantly expanded sanctions covering Russian President Vladimir Putin and other government members, and banned "selected Russian banks" from using the SWIFT international payments system, triggering the 2022 Russian financial crisis and a massive international boycott of Russia and Belarus, which supports the invasion.

Background and history of sanctions and ramifications

History of sanctions 

Western countries and others imposed limited sanctions on Russia after it recognised the independence of its puppet states, the Donetsk and Luhansk People's Republics, on 21 February 2022 in a speech by Vladimir Putin. With the commencement of attacks on 24 February 2022, a large number of other countries began applying sanctions with the aim of devastating the Russian economy. The sanctions were wide-ranging, targeting individuals, banks, businesses, monetary exchanges, bank transfers, exports, and imports. The sanctions included cutting off major Russian banks from SWIFT, the global messaging network for international payments, although there would still be limited accessibility to ensure the continued ability to pay for gas shipments. Sanctions also included asset freezes on the Russian Central Bank, which holds $630 billion in foreign-exchange reserves, to prevent it from offsetting the impact of sanctions and implicated the Nord Stream 2 gas pipeline. By 1 March, the total amount of Russian assets frozen by sanctions amounted to $1 trillion.

Major multinational companies including Apple, IKEA, ExxonMobil, and General Motors, have individually decided to apply sanctions to Russia. Ukrainian and Western governments have explicitly urged the global private sector to help uphold international law, and the EU, UK and Australia have also called on global digital platforms to remove pro-Russian propaganda. Multinational companies have disengaged from Russia to comply with sanctions and trade restrictions imposed by home states, but also on their own accord, beyond what was required by law, to avoid the economic and reputational risks associated with maintaining commercial ties with Russia.

Several countries that are historically neutral, such as Switzerland and Singapore, have agreed to sanctions. Some countries also applied sanctions to Belarusian organisations and individuals, such as President Alexander Lukashenko, because of Belarus' involvement in the invasion. 

In response to the invasion, Germany's chancellor, Olaf Scholz, suspended the Nord Stream 2 pipeline and announced a new policy of energy independence from Russia. In addition, Germany provided arms shipments to Ukraine, the first time that it provided arms to a country at war since the end of World War II. Germany also increased defence expenditures by approximately $100 billion, by some estimates making it the third largest military spender in the world. German industry shifted from reliance on Russian natural gas to producing more energy with renewable sources, importing gas and coal to provide power and heating while new power generation facilities could be built.

Upon his arrival for the NATO extraordinary summit in Brussels on 24 March, U.S. President Joe Biden indicated that further economic sanctions would be placed against Russia, including restrictions on the Russian Central Bank's use of gold in transactions and a new round of sanctions that targeted defense companies, the head of Russia's largest bank, and more than 300 members of the Russian State Duma.

On 27 February 2022, Putin responded to the sanctions, and to what he called "aggressive statements" by Western governments, by ordering the country's "deterrence forces"—generally understood to include its nuclear forces—to be put on a "special regime of combat duty". This novel term provoked some confusion as to what exactly was changing, but US officials declared it generally "escalatory". Following sanctions and criticisms of their relations with Russian business, a boycott movement began and many companies and organisations chose to exit Russian or Belarusian markets voluntarily. The boycotts impacted many consumer goods, entertainment, education, technology, and sporting organisations.

The US instituted export controls, a novel sanction focused on restricting Russian access to high-tech components, both hardware and software, made with any parts or intellectual property from the US. The sanction required that any person or company that wanted to sell technology, semiconductors, encryption software, lasers, or sensors to Russia request a license, which by default was denied. The enforcement mechanism involved sanctions against the person or company, with the sanctions focused on the shipbuilding, aerospace, and defence industries. 

During a speech at the UN General Assembly in New York City on 20 September 2022, French president Emmanuel Macron asked, "who here can defend the idea that the invasion of Ukraine justifies no sanctions?" He purported neutral states to be "indifferent" towards the conflict.

On 9 December 2022, Canada imposed new sanctions on Russia, alleging human rights violations. The decision includes sanctions against 33 current or former senior Russian officials and six entities involved in alleged "systematic human rights violations" against Russian citizens who protested against Russia's invasion of Ukraine.

On 16 December 2022, The EU introduced a ninth package of sanctions against the Russian economy. A spokesperson for the Belgian government said, "It is becoming increasingly difficult to impose sanctions that hit Russia hard enough, without excessive collateral damage to the EU."

Sanctions 

Western countries and others began imposing limited sanctions on Russia when it recognised the independence of self-declared Donbass republics. With the commencement of attacks on 24 February, a large number of other countries began applying sanctions with the aim of devastating the Russian economy. The sanctions were wide-ranging, targeting individuals, banks, businesses, monetary exchanges, bank transfers, exports, and imports.

After Russia invaded Ukraine on 24 February 2022, two countries that had not previously taken part in sanctions, namely South Korea and non-UN member state Taiwan, engaged in sanctions against Russia. On 28 February 2022, Singapore announced that it will impose banking sanctions against Russia for Ukraine invasion, thus making them the first country in Southeast Asia to impose sanctions upon Russia.

The sanctions also included materials that could be used for weapons against Ukraine, as well as electronics, technology devices and other related equipment, which were listed in a detailed statement on 5 March.

On 25 February and 1 March 2022 Serbia, Mexico and Brazil announced that they would not be participating in any economic sanctions against Russia.

On 28 February 2022, the Central Bank of Russia was blocked from accessing more than $400 billion in foreign-exchange reserves held abroad and the EU imposed sanctions on several Russian oligarchs and politicians. On the same day US Foreign Assets Control (OFAC) prohibited United States persons from engaging in transactions with Central Bank of Russia, Russian Direct Investment Fund (including its predecessor, JSC RDIF, sanctioned previously), the Russian Venture Company, and Kirill Dmitriev, an ally of Vladimir Putin, personally.

Sergei Aleksashenko, the former Russian deputy finance minister, said: "This is a kind of financial nuclear bomb that is falling on Russia." On 1 March 2022, the French finance minister Bruno Le Maire said the total amount of Russian assets being frozen by sanctions amounted to $1 trillion.

Fossil fuels and other commodities 

On 28 February 2022, Canada banned imports of Russian crude oil. On 8 June, Canada banned services to the Russian oil, mining, gas, and chemical industries.

On 8 March 2022, US President Joe Biden ordered a ban on imports of oil, gas and coal from Russia to the United States.

Also on 8 March 2022, Shell announced its intention to withdraw from the Russian hydrocarbons industry.

Switzerland is a major hub for commodities trading globally. As such, about 80% of Russia's commodity trading goes through Geneva and there are an estimated 40 commodities companies linked to Russia in Zug. Glencore, Gunvor, Vitol, Trafigura and Lukoil Litasco SA are oil and commodities trading firms with stakes in Rosneft and Lukoil, two major Russian oil companies. Magnitogorsk Iron and Steel Works (MMK), a Russian-based company in Lugano, is also a major player in commodities/steel trading with Eastern Europe. 

In May 2022, the European Commission proposed a ban on oil imports from Russia. The proposal was reduced to a ban on oil imports by sea to appease Hungary, whose prime minister, Viktor Orbán, has befriended Putin and which gets 60% of its oil from Russia via pipelines. European imports of oil supplied by pipelines from Russia is estimated at 800,000 barrels a day and is an exception to the sanctions, with oil transit insurance bans being phased over several months. Germany and Poland have vowed to end pipeline deliveries.

In response to the invasion of Ukraine by Russia, the European Commission and International Energy Agency presented joint plans to reduce reliance on Russian energy, reduce Russian gas imports by two thirds within a year, and completely by 2030. In April 2022, European Commission President Ursula von der Leyen said "the era of Russian fossil fuels in Europe will come to an end". On 18 May 2022, the European Union published plans to end its reliance on Russian oil, natural gas and coal by 2027.

On 2 September, the G7 group of nations agreed to cap the price of Russian oil in order to reduce Russia's ability to finance its war with Ukraine without further increasing inflation. This was followed by the European Union on 6 October, when in its 8th round of sanctions agreed to price cap Russian oil imports (for Europe and third countries) with a price maximum to be set on 5 December 2022. A number of nations, including Hungary and Serbia gained major exemptions from the agreement.

Banking 

In a 22 February  2022 speech, US president Joe Biden announced restrictions against four Russian banks, including V.E.B., as well as on corrupt billionaires close to Putin. UK prime minister Boris Johnson announced that all major Russian banks would have their assets frozen and be excluded from the UK financial system, and that some export licences to Russia would be suspended. He also introduced a deposit limit for Russian citizens in UK bank accounts, and froze the assets of over 100 additional individuals and entities.

Days later, and after substantial negotiation between European nations, an agreement was made to expel many Russian banks from the SWIFT international banking network.

On 26 February, two Chinese state banks—the Industrial and Commercial Bank of China, which is the largest bank in the world, and the Bank of China, which is the country's biggest currency trader—were limiting financing to purchase Russian raw materials, which was limiting Russian access to foreign currency. On 28 February, Switzerland froze a number of Russian assets and joined EU sanctions. According to Ignazio Cassis, the president of the Swiss Confederation, the decision was unprecedented but consistent with Swiss neutrality. The same day, Monaco adopted economic sanctions and procedures for freezing funds identical to those taken by most European states. Singapore became the first Southeast Asian country to impose sanctions on Russia by restricting banks and transactions linked to Russia; the move was described by the South China Morning Post as being "almost unprecedented". South Korea announced it would participate in the SWIFT ban against Russia, as well as announcing an export ban on strategic materials covered by the "Big 4" treaties to which Korea belongs—the Nuclear Suppliers Group, the Wassenaar Arrangement, the Australia Group, and the Missile Technology Control Regime; in addition, 57 non-strategic materials, including semiconductors, IT equipment, sensors, lasers, maritime equipment, and aerospace equipment, were planned to be included in the export ban "soon".

On 28 February, Japan announced that its central bank would join sanctions by limiting transactions with Russia's central bank, and would impose sanctions on Belarusian organisations and individuals, including President Aleksandr Lukashenko, because of Belarus' "evident involvement in the invasion" of Ukraine.

EU sanctions 

On the morning of 24 February, Ursula von der Leyen, the president of the European Commission, announced "massive" EU sanctions to be adopted by the union. The sanctions targeted technological transfers, Russian banks, and Russian assets. Josep Borrell, the High Representative of the Union for Foreign Affairs and Security Policy, stated that Russia would face "unprecedented isolation" as the EU would impose the "harshest package of sanctions [which the union has] ever implemented". He also said that "these are among the darkest hours of Europe since the Second World War". President of the European Parliament Roberta Metsola called for "immediate, quick, solid and swift action" and convened an extraordinary session of Parliament for 1 March.

European impoundment of yachts
A 5 April 2022 article by Insider claims the total cost of yachts impounded throughout Europe to be over $2 billion. This amount includes the motoryacht Tango, seized pursuant to United States sanctions with Spanish assistance.

France
On 26 February, the French Navy intercepted Russian cargo ship Baltic Leader in the English Channel. The ship was suspected of belonging to a company targeted by the sanctions. The ship was escorted to the port of Boulogne-sur-Mer and was being investigated.

On 2 March 2022, French customs officials seized the yacht Amore Vero at a shipyard in La Ciotat. The Amore Vero is believed to be owned by the sanctioned oligarch Igor Sechin.

Two yachts belonging to Alexei Kuzmichev of Alfa Bank were seized by France on March 24.

Germany
On 2 March 2022, German authorities immobilized the Dilbar, owned by Alisher Usmanov. She is reported to have cost $800 million, employ 84 full-time crew members, and contain the largest indoor swimming pool installed on a superyacht at 180 cubic metres.

Italy

On 4 March 2022, Italian police impounded the yacht Lady M. Authorities believe the ship is owned by Alexei Mordashov. The same day, Italian police seized the yacht of Gennady Timchenko, the Lena, in the port city of Sanremo. The yacht was also placed on a United States sanctions list. On 12 March 2022, Italian authorities in the port of Trieste seized the sailing yacht A, known to be owned by Andrey Melnichenko. A spokesperson for Melnichenko vowed to contest the seizure.

Spain
In March 2022, the Spanish Ministry of Development (known by its acronym "MITMA") detained three yachts pending investigation into whether their true owners are individuals sanctioned by the European Union. The Valerie is detained in the Port of Barcelona; Lady Anastasia in Port Adriano in Calvià, Mallorca; and the Crescent in the Port of Tarragona.

United Kingdom
On 29 March 2022, Grant Shapps, the British secretary of state for transport, announced the National Crime Agency's seizure of the PHI. The yacht was docked at Canary Wharf and was about to leave.

Netherlands 
On 6 April 2022, Dutch Minister of Foreign Affairs Wopke Hoekstra sent a letter on the subject of sanctions addressed to the House of Representatives. In it, he reported that while no Russian superyachts were at anchor in the Netherlands, twelve yachts under construction across five shipyards were immobilized to ascertain ownership, including possible beneficial ownership.

Aviation 
The EU sanctions introduced on 25 February included a ban on the sale of aircraft and spare parts, and also required lessors to terminate the leases on aircraft placed with Russian airlines by the end of March.

Services and spare parts 
On 2 March 2022, Airbus and Boeing both suspended maintenance support for Russian airlines.
On 11 March, China blocked the supply of aircraft parts to Russia.
Business jet manufacturer Bombardier Aviation announced that, in addition to suspending after-sales service activities, it had cancelled all outstanding orders placed by Russian individuals or companies.
As of April 2022, spare part and repair difficulties for the Safran/Saturn SaM146 engines used on the Sukhoi Superjet 100 were expected to force Russian airlines to ground the type.
The lack of approved spare parts has also affected foreign aircraft flying into Russian airports.

In June 2022, the Russian government advised its airlines to use some aircraft for parts. That same month, Patrick Ky, executive director of the European Aviation Safety Agency (EASA), expressed concern about the safety of Western-made aircraft flying in Russia without proper access to spare parts or maintenance. He highlighted that risks increase over time and cited reports that Russia will be forced to cannibalise aircraft. In August 2022, Reuters reported confirmation from "four industry sources" that Russia had stripped parts from Airbus A320s and A350s, a Boeing 737 and a Sukhoi Superjet in order to perform maintenance on other aircraft. Around 15% of Aeroflot's fleet appeared to be grounded.

Leased aircraft 
On 10 March 2022, Russia passed legislation outlining conditions to impede the return of leased aircraft to foreign lessors, including the need for approval from a government committee and payment of settlements in Roubles.
Many aircraft operated by Russian airlines had been registered with the Bermuda registry, which suspended airworthiness approvals on 14 March. The same day, Russia implemented a law allowing aircraft operated by Russian airlines to be re-registered with the Russian registry, effectively confiscating them from their overseas owners. Some 515 commercial aircraft, valued at approximately $10 billion, were leased by Russian airlines from foreign lessors prior to the sanctions. Lessors moved swiftly to repossess those few aircraft "stranded" outside Russia and reassigned some new aircraft due to be placed with Russian airlines, particularly Boeing 737 MAX that are now unlikely ever to be recertified by Russia.
By 22 March, 78 foreign-owned aircraft had been reclaimed, amid speculation that some Russian airlines were cooperating with lessors in order to avoid jeopardising future relations.
Rossiya Airlines, a subsidiary of Aeroflot, had reregistered all its fleet with the Russian registry by 29 March.

By 30 March, Irish lessor AerCap had repossessed 22 of the 135 aircraft it had leased to Russian airlines, and 3 of the 14 engines on lease. It filed insurance claims totalling $3.5 billion for the remaining aircraft, many of which were "now being flown illegally by [its] former airline customers". Singapore-based lessor BOC Aviation had 18 aircraft worth $935 million on lease to Russian companies; it repossessed from Hong Kong one Boeing 747-8F leased to AirBridgeCargo but two other freighters were flown back to Russia contrary to explicit instructions, despite their insurance coverage and airworthiness certificates having been revoked.

On 31 March, Russian Deputy Prime Minister Yury Borisov declared that all leased aircraft still in Russia had been re-registered and would remain in Russia, a total of over 400 aircraft. However, re-registration of aircraft without their owners' consent is a breach of ICAO standards. These aircraft may be confiscated and repossessed upon landing in any airport outside of Russia.

Aeroflot gradually resumed international flights to "friendly" countries: to Kyrgyzstan from 14 March, Azerbaijan on 21 March, Armenia from 22 March, Iran from 2 April, Sri Lanka from 8 April, and Turkey and India from 6 May. On 2 June, an Aeroflot A330 belonging to an Irish lessor was temporarily impounded by a commercial court in Sri Lanka, though the aircraft was subsequently allowed to return to Russia on 5 June.

On 13 May, Aeroflot announced that it had purchased 8 A330s from foreign leasing companies, under an exemption that allows the execution of a lease solely to obtain repayments.
On 1 June, it emerged that five Russian airlines had kept a total of 31 aircraft outside Russia and returned them to lessors. Other airlines including Aeroflot have deposited money in special Rouble accounts to enable lessors to claim the amounts once sanctions are lifted.
In August, S7 Airlines was given special permission to "export" its two 737 MAX aircraft to Turkey in order to return them to their lessor.

Airspace 

On 24 February 2022, Ukrainian airspace was closed to civilian aircraft a few hours before the Russian invasion started, on the basis of a notification from the Russian Ministry of Defence. The European regulator EASA issued a Conflict Zone Information Bulletin (CZIB) warning that civilian aircraft could be misidentified or even directly targeted.

On 25 February, the UK announced the closure of its airspace to Russian airlines. On 27 February, the EU and Canada closed their airspace to all Russian aircraft, including both commercial and private aircraft. Russia issued a reciprocal ban, forcing many airlines to reroute or cancel flights to Asian destinations. The US issued a similar ban on 1 March.
On 8 March, Aeroflot suspended all its remaining flights to international destinations (except for Minsk, Belarus) due to airspace restrictions and to counter the "risk" of aircraft being repossessed by lessors.
On 9 March, to avoid Russian airspace, Finnair started routing its flights to Asia over the North Pole, the first time a polar route has been used for commercial flights in nearly 30 years.
An analysis of routes between Europe and Asia showed increased travel distances of between 1200 and 4000 km; the frequency of flights to some destinations has been reduced and other routes have been dropped.

By 29 March 2022, the following countries and territories had completely closed their airspace to all Russian airlines and Russian-registered private jets:

 

 

 

 
 
 

 (since 2015)

 (EU27)

In addition to airspace closure under sanctions, on 11 April EASA blacklisted 21 Russian airlines on safety grounds, given that aircraft are being operated without airworthiness certificates, in breach of the Chicago Convention and international safety standards. EASA clarified that the Russian air transport regulator, Rosaviatsia, had failed to provide evidence that it has the capacity to perform the oversight activities required to ensure air safety.
The US Federal Aviation Administration also downgraded Russia's safety rating, meaning that no new services to the US and no codeshares with US carriers are authorised.

In May 2022, the UK announced that Russian airlines would be prohibited from selling their landing slots at UK airports, valued at approximately £50 million. The slots were subsequently reallocated to other airlines.

At the end of May 2022, the Civil Aviation Administration of China (CAAC) closed its airspace to aircraft that have been re-registered with the Russian registry in breach of ICAO regulations and for which the airlines are thus unable to provide proper documentation.

Russian aircraft manufacturing industry
EASA revoked the type certificates of the Sukhoi Superjet 100, Tupolev Tu-204 and four other Russian aircraft types on 14 March, as well as approvals of maintenance organisations and third-country authorisations for Russian airlines. EASA also suspended all work on new certification applications, including the Irkut MC-21 airliner. 
Due to the need to source all aircraft components domestically, notably the Pratt & Whitney PW1400G engines which will be replaced by Russian-built Aviadvigatel PD-14 units, production of the MC-21 is expected to be delayed by 2 years. In the meantime, production of older and less fuel-efficient Russian-built aircraft such as the Tupolev Tu-214 and Ilyushin Il-96-400 will be stepped up, and a fuel subsidy introduced.
The Sino-Russian CR929 wide-body aircraft programme, which was already in difficulty due to the diverging expectations of the two parties, is also expected to suffer significant delays or even cancellation.

On 29 June, the US government expanded its sanctions to cover United Aircraft Corporation (UAC) (the parent company of Irkut, United Engine, Tupolev, Ilyushin and others), with an exemption allowing UAC to export parts and services for civil aircraft not registered in Russia if necessary for aviation safety.

Aviation industry organisations and alliances
On 15 March, Aeroflot CEO Mikhail Poluboyarinov, who is targeted with EU sanctions, was removed from the IATA board of governors.

In April, the two Russian airlines that were members of global airline alliances both saw their memberships suspended: S7 Airlines from Oneworld and Aeroflot from SkyTeam.

 U.S. "freeze and seize" policy
The main United States sanctions law, IEEPA, blocks the designated person or entity's assets, and also prohibits any United States person from transacting business with the designated person or entity. Specifically,  criminalizes activities that "violate, attempt to violate, conspire to violate, or cause a violation of any license, order, regulation, or prohibition," and allows for fines up to $1,000,000, imprisonment up to 20 years, or both. Additionally, United States asset forfeiture laws allow for the seizure of assets considered to be the proceeds of criminal activity.

On 3 February 2022, John "Jack" Hanick was arrested in London for violating the sanctions against Konstantin Malofeev, owner of Tsargrad TV. Malofeev is targeted with sanctions by the European Union and United States for material and financial support to Donbass separatists. Hanick was the first person criminally indicted for violating United States sanctions during the War in Ukraine.

According to court records, Hanick has been under sealed indictment in the United States District Court for the Southern District of New York since November 2021. The indictment was unsealed March 3, 2022. Hanick awaits extradition from the United Kingdom to the United States.

In the March 1, 2022 State of the Union Address, American President Joe Biden announced an effort to target the wealth of Russian oligarchs.
On March 2, 2022, U.S. Attorney General Merrick B. Garland announced the formation of Task Force KleptoCapture, an inter-agency effort.

On March 11, 2022, United States President Joseph R. Biden signed , "Prohibiting Certain Imports, Exports, and New Investment With Respect to Continued Russian Federation Aggression," an order of economic sanctions under the United States International Emergency Economic Powers Act against several oligarchs. The order targeted two properties of Viktor Vekselberg worth an estimated $180 million: an Airbus A319-115 jet and the motoryacht Tango. Estimates of the value of the Tango range from $90 million (U.S. Department of Justice estimate) to $120 million (from the website Superyachtfan.com).

On April 4, 2022, the yacht was seized by Civil Guard of Spain and U.S. federal agents in Mallorca. A United States Department of Justice press release states that the seizure of the Tango was by request of Task Force KleptoCapture, an interagency task force operated through the U.S. Deputy Attorney General.

The matter is pending in the United States District Court for the District of Columbia.

Other entities
On 9 March 2022, the New Zealand Parliament passed the Russia Sanctions Act 2022, which allows for sanctions to be placed on individuals connected to the 2022 Russian invasion of Ukraine and targets their assets including funds, ships, and planes. New Zealand also created a blacklist targeting senior Russian officials and oligarchs. On 6 April, New Zealand also imposed a 35% tariff on Russian products while restricting industrial exports to Russia.

The Bahamas, Antigua and Barbuda and Saint Kitts and Nevis also joined the list of imposing sanctions on Russia.

On 2 May, Finnish consortium Fennovoima announced that it had terminated its contract with Russia's state-owned nuclear power supplier Rosatom for the delivery of a planned nuclear power plant in Finland.

Summary of sanctions by regions

The sanctions campaign including:

 Republic of Korea

British Overseas Territories

Crown Dependencies

Counties

 Shifting of safe havens and sanctions evasion 

Switzerland

Switzerland follows the EU sanctions and in response was put on the list of "unfriendly nations" by Russia. According to the Swiss Embassy in Moscow, Switzerland has long been "the most important destination worldwide for rich Russians to manage their wealth". 
The Bank for International Settlements estimates that Russian nationals have only $11 billion deposited in Swiss bank accounts, though other estimates are much higher: for example the Neue Zürcher Zeitung estimates the amount deposited to be CHF 150 billion and the Swiss Bankers Association states even between CHF 150 and 200 billion (between US$160 and 214 billion). As of July 2022, CHF 6.7 billion had been frozen by the Swiss authorities, according to Swiss authorities more than any other country has. 
The sanctions target at least 1156 people and 98 companies which were identified by the EU.

Leading Russian opposition figures, including British financier Bill Browder, have criticised Switzerland by saying the country is not doing nearly enough, while granting Russia too many loopholes in commodities trading, real estate investing or banking sector. According to U.S. Ambassador to Switzerland Scott Miller in 2023, "Switzerland could block an additional CHF 50-100 billion” of the Russian assets.

In May 2022, the Helsinki Commission of the U.S. Congress accused Switzerland to be "a leading enabler of Russian dictator Vladimir Putin and his cronies"a claim that was strongly rejected by the Swiss government stating that "the country implements all sanctions that were decided by the EU and the Federal Council". The Federal Council of Switzerland called the allegations of the Helsinki Commission "politically unacceptable" and the President of the Swiss Confederation complained in a phone call with the US secretary of state Antony Blinken about the accusations. Switzerland hosted an international conference in Lugano on 5 July 2022 to finance the rebuilding of war-torn Ukraine. In August 2022, Switzerland adopted new EU sanctions to ban all Russian gold imports. At the same time, new exceptions with respect to financial transactions related to agricultural products and oil supplies to third countries were also made public.UkraineRecovery Conference 2022, Lugano. Switzerland Retrieved 13 July 2022. In September, Switzerland stopped sharing tax information with Russia; Russia therefore no longer receives information about financial accounts Russian citizens have in Switzerland.

United Arab Emirates

Lured by the United Arab Emirates' flexible visa program, many wealthy Russians moved their money to the UAE. Property purchases in Dubai by Russians surged by 67% in the first three months of 2022. Around 200,000 Russians were estimated to have left the country in the first 10 days of the war. Investigations revealed that private jets and yachts belonging to sanctioned Russian oligarchs and billionaires were found in places like Dubai and the Maldives. A number of private jets belonging to sanctioned Russians were also tracked flying back and forth between Moscow and Tel Aviv, and between Russia and Dubai. Some Russians also began to utilize the UAE's "golden visa" program, which could allow these oligarchs to live, work, and study in the UAE with full ownership of their business.

In May 2022, European Parliament members suggested that the UAE should be blacklisted for allowing sanctioned Russian oligarchs and other officials to invest in properties and businesses in Dubai.

A Russian oligarch, Andrey Melnichenko was sanctioned by the European Union in March 2022, after claims that he attended a meeting with Putin on the day of the invasion. Following the sanctions, Italian authorities seized Melnichenko's $600 million Sailing Yacht A. Another yacht belonging to him, the $300 million Motor Yacht A was identified parked in a port in Ras al-Khaimah in the UAE. A $350 million Boeing 787 Dreamliner private jet belonging to Roman Abramovich was also grounded in Dubai. The US Department of Justice has an order from a US federal judge to seize the jet. Politicians and campaigners, including Danish MEP Kira Marie Peter-Hansen and campaigner Bill Browder, called for the UAE to be blacklisted for allowing the flow of "dirty money" and acting as a refuge for sanctioned Russians.

On 23 June 2022, the Madame Gu superyacht, owned by sanctioned billionaire Andrey Skoch, was reported to have been docked at Port Rashid in Dubai since 25 March. It was designated as sanctioned property by the US. In June 2022, Russia's wealthiest oligarch, Vladimir Potanin moved his $300 million superyacht, Nirvana, to Dubai. Potanin was not sanctioned at the time, and the move to shift the luxury superyacht to Dubai's Port Rashid was a precautionary measure.

An investigation by the Energy Intelligence revealed that UAE-based companies are marketing Russia's oil to escape European and international sanctions. EU sanctions forced traditional players such as Vitol, Trafigura and Glencore out of the market. As western sanctions ramped up, many new names appeared on shipping lists as cranes for Russian crude, some of which appear to have been incorporated in the UAE.

The United Arab Emirates defends its stance on sanctions targeting Russian individuals by stating that it remains neutral and has not imposed sanctions. The UAE stated that its state policy complies with the international rights norms, stipulated by the United Nations Organization, which has not imposed any sanctions.

Georgia

Between the beginning of the full-scale invasion of Ukraine and 2 December 2022, more than 10,000 Russian-owned businesses were registered in Georgia, many of them in remote villages. For example, the tiny village of Untsa, Adigeni has more registered Russian-owned businesses than inhabitants, as of October 2022. In a single empty house in the village of Vakhani, Kharagauli there were over 200 registered Russian-owned businesses.

In the context of a massive immigration wave to Georgia, this has particularly contributed to rising fears that the country will become more economically dependent on Russia, more vulnerable to blackmail by Moscow, and that the war in Ukraine will drag on due to sanctions being evaded in countries like Georgia. For this reason, Georgians who help Russians take root in Georgia have been publicly upbraided as collaborators and traitors.

Protests have been held in Georgia demanding the introduction of a visa regime with Russia. The ruling Georgian Dream government has dismissed such a step as "irrational." The FSB has also sent agents to infiltrate Georgia amidst the immigration wave. Once exposed, the news "barely makes a ripple" in Georgia's media.

Effects on Russian economy

In April 2022, Russia supplied 45% of EU's gas imports, earning $900 million a day. In the first two months after the invasion of Ukraine, Russia earned $66.5 billion from fossil fuel exports, and the EU accounted for 71% of that trade.

The Russian rouble reached its highest evaluation against the US Dollar and Euro since 2015. However, this valuation has been referred to as a falsified "Potemkin rate" because sanctions prevent trading with foreign accounts or currencies. In May 2022, the Russian Central Bank last slashed its key rate by 300 basis points to 11% in order to stimulate local investments. The federal trade surplus was increased due to high prices for Russian commodity exports and a rapid fall in imports. On 27 May 2022, Russian Finance Minister Anton Siluanov stated that extra revenues from the sale of natural gas in the amount of €13.7 billion will be used to increase pension funds for retired individuals and families with children, as well for "special operations" in the Ukraine. Russia has also increased energy exports to China and India to make up for decreased revenues in Europe. Bloomberg reported that in the first half of 2022, Russia pocketed an extra $24 billion from selling energy to both nations.

According to the IMF in its April 11, 2022 country report on Russia, the Russian economy is projected to see a -8.5% decrease in its real GDP in 2022, with inflation of 21.3% in that same year. Despite projected contractions in some economic sectors, Russia has so far managed to avoid defaulting on its foreign currency debt. Russian inflation came in at a two-decade high of 17.8% year-on-year in April, up from 16.7% in March, but inflation on basic commodities such as food and fuel were modest. Consumer price growth slowed sharply from 7.6% in March to 1.6% in April, in line with some Western countries.

Citizens of the Russian Federation face surging inflation and unemployment, expensive credit, capital controls, restricted travel, and shortages of goods. Analysts have identified similarities with conditions in the decade following the collapse of the Soviet Union in 1991. Russia's Kaliningrad exclave faces ever-increasing isolation. A source close to the Kremlin told the Russian-language independent news website Meduza'' that "There's probably almost nobody who's happy with Putin. Businesspeople and many cabinet members are unhappy that the president started this war without thinking through the scale of the sanctions. Normal life under these sanctions is impossible." But, Vladimir Putin said that who driving by Mercedes-Benz S-Class 600 and consume luxury products will continue to do it in future.

On 27 June 2022, Bloomberg reported that Russia is poised to default on its foreign debt (eurobonds), for the first time since 1918 after the Bolshevik revolution. According to the source, the country missed a debt payment due to sanctions on Russian banks. Finance Minister Siluanov dismissed the possible default status as a "farce", since Russia has plenty of funds to repay the debt. Associated Press reported that the official default on Russian's foreign debt would take time to be confirmed. Financial analysts described Russia's situation as unique, since it has extensive amounts of cash to fulfill its debt obligations. 

In late July 2022, the IMF upgraded Russia's GDP estimate by 2.5%, but some economists see a long-term problem for the Russian economy, and explain its resilience only by a short-term increase of energy prices. A Yale study projects a catastrophic outlook for Russian businesses if Western countries are able to keep up the sanctions against Russia's petrochemical industry. So far, Russia was able to leverage its economic power by cutting gas supplies to Europe, and play up its agricultural might as the largest wheat exporter globally. Western economists see long-lasting costs to the Russian economy from the exit of large foreign firms and brain drain, while Russia claims it has replaced those entities with domestic investments. Long term, Russia's economy will depend on the price development of fossil fuel energy, and Russia's continued economic alliances with countries that do not impose sanctions, including China, the Middle East, India, as well as nations in Africa and South America.

Russia's gross domestic product contracted 4% in the second quarter of 2022, revised from 6.5%, with a 15.3% drop in wholesale trade, and a 9.8% contraction in retail trade. Despite the ongoing sanctions, 47 of the world's biggest 200 companies still have not left Russia, particularly energy companies remain invested there. U.K. energy giant Shell and Japanese trading firms Mitsui and Mitsubishi hold double-digit stakes in the Sakhalin-2 oil and natural gas project. On July 1, 2022, Putin signed a decree to allow the government to seize the Sakhalin-2 oil and natural gas project but further attempts to formally nationalize the assets of international firms were paused when the bill did not make it through the State Duma before the 2022 summer recess.  According to Western analysts, remaining companies have experienced expropriation and nationalization pressures, but officially Russia has denied that it is interested in such actions. In August 2022, Russia's trade and industry minister Denis Manturov stated, "we are not interested in the nationalization of enterprises or their removal." In October 2022, the decree was approved, allowing a Russian state-run company to seize ExxonMobil's 30% stake in the Sakhalin-1 oil and gas project, and to decide whether foreign shareholders, including Japan's SODECO, can retain their participation.

Russia pumps almost as much oil as before its 2022 invasion of the Ukraine. Sales to the Middle East and Asia have made up for declining exports of gas and oil to Europe, and due to the higher price, Moscow made $20 billion monthly compared to $14.6 billion a year before (2021). Despite international sanctions, Russian energy sales have increased in value, and its exports have expanded with new financing options and payment methods for international buyers. According to the Institute of International Finance, "Russia is swimming in cash", earning $97 billion from oil and gas sales through July 2022. According to a former Russian energy executive, "there came a realization that the world needs oil, and nobody's brave enough to embargo 7.5 million barrels a day of Russian oil and oil products".

According to the Former First Deputy Chairman of the Central Bank of Russia Oleg Vyugin, sanctions imposed against Moscow over the conflict in Ukraine were only 30%-40% effective as Russia has found ways to overcome restrictions. He confirmed the contraction of the Russian economy by 4% in 2022 due to sanctions, but found this has been "no catastrophe" for the Russian Federation. Russia's current account surplusthe difference in value between exports and importshas been soaring due to declining imports, but he warned that a further embargo on Russian exports could reduce crucial revenues. He also added that the impact of US and European export controls in the technology sector will be felt with some delay.

In October 2022, Russia's exports of crude to China had again surpassed Saudi Arabia's for the 3rd month. Significant increases were seen through the Eastern Siberia–Pacific Ocean oil pipeline and seaborne shipments from Russia's European and Far Eastern ports, up 7.6% from a year ago, according to Chinese customs data. Increased Russian oil exports are particularly significant during an overall decline of 9.5% crude oil imports into China due to lower economic growth.

In December 2022, when the European Union implemented its oil embargo and price cap on Russian crude, economic news channels reported a drop of Russian oil exports by 54% in the first week. A number of oil companies were no longer using Russian cargoes, including Shell corporation and ExxonMobil. But Russia was already sending nearly 90% of its oil to Asia before the sanctions were implemented. Shipowners in Asia as well were reportedly less likely to transport Russian crude after the European sanctions came into force. In late 2022, the Russian economy's relative resilience to Western sanctions was tested when financial sanctions seriously impacted Russia's VTB Bank, the country's No. 2 lender. VTB bank has frozen assets abroad worth around 600 billion roubles, and then purchased Otkritie FC Bank to make up for the loss (Italy's UniCredit was initially interested in a takeover). The Bank of Russia agreed to the sale for 233 billion roubles in cash and treasury bonds, increasing the share-value for Moscow-listed VTB. Dominant lender Sberbank, however, was less affected by financial sanctions and produced a quarterly profit. The central bank announced a bail-out of 555 billion roubles, and with the recent sale of Otkritie obtained a refund of 352 billion roubles.

According to Russian calculations, the country's economy shrank by 2.5% in 2022, showing better dynamics than expected by Western analysts. Both Russia's current trade account balance and foreign currency reserves increased significantly due to decreased imports from Western countries. Because of the increased expenditure for the 2022 Russian invasion of Ukraine, Moscow posted a record budget deficit of USD 47.3 billion in 2022 (2.3% of GDP). Some of the reduction in trade with Western Europe was compensated by a record trade balance with China, USD 190 billion in 2022. The Russian state as well as its citizens purchased a record amount of gold from Russian banks in 2022 (64 to 67 metric tons) due to tax-free profit from gold sales, and economic instability from Western sanctions. Gold, which significantly increased in value in late 2022 and early 2023, is seen as another backbone of the Russian economy. Russia attempts to create a gold-backed stablecoin to support its foreign trade in light of ongoing sanctions.

Two financial reports from late 2022 and early 2023 concluded that only 8.5% or less than one out of ten companies had divested at least one subsidiary in Russia. In comparison between economic regions, 18% of US companies with subsidiaries exited Russia, some 15% of Japanese firms and only 8.3% of EU firms have done the same. Among EU nations, Italian companies were least likely to exit from Russia. Particularly firms involved in lucrative resource extraction and agriculture remain active there, but also pharmaceutical companies, which are exempt from sanctions. Quantitatively, those companies which left Russia (a total of 120) represent only 6.5% of total profits of all the firms active there. Even companies that planned a full withdrawal had struggled to pull out their businesses swiftly and comply with sanctions or NGO demands, according to business analysts. Out of the 120 out of 1404 total EU and G7 companies that have left Russia. Out of the 120 leaving companies 25% where American, 12.5% where Finnish and 11.7% where German. There were western 1284 companies that elected to stay in Russia. 19.5% were German, 16.4% Cyprus and 12.4% American companies were the amongst the top stayers in Russia.https://papers.ssrn.com/sol3/papers.cfm?abstract_id=4322502 This means, that the boycott of Russia by western companies operating in Russia is relatively low, but also different in different countries. While Evenett, in an interview with Yle stated "Voluntariness is therefore not enough. If Western companies are wanted out of Russia, according to Evenett, states must introduce more aggressive measures", thus indicating western countries might need to take measures to make companies to leave Russia. The same Yle article states that Finland stands out for its high percentage amongst those leaving, mentioning Atria, YIT, and Ponsse among them. Reasons why companies might have wanted to stay on Russia is that it is not easy to sell off a western company's daughter company, Fortum is mentioned as such an example, having attempted to sell off its subsidiary, but failing to find a buyer. This does not explain everything, some companies don't just care about the war.

Year on year, Russian car production fell 67% from 2022 to 2023. Truck production decreased 24%  A particularly drastic fall occurred in May 2022 when car production dropped 97%, but rebounded after some adaptations. Car sales fell 63%

Effect on global food supply 

Western countries have accused Russia of interfering with wheat exports from Ukraine due to the naval blockade of Odesa and other Ukrainian ports. Russia responded by stating that international sanctions hinder the export of wheat from the Russian Federation.

The head of the African Union, Senegalese President Macky Sall, remarked that the side effects of the EU's decision to expel many Russian banks from SWIFT will hurt the ability of African countries to pay for imported food and fertilizers from Russia. French President Emmanuel Macron responded that any disruptions have nothing to do with EU sanctions.

On 22 July 2022, Russia and Ukraine signed a deal to allow Ukrainian grain exports through the blockade.

On 14 September 2022, UN Secretary-General Antonio Guterres reiterated his concerns over a constrained fertilizer supply from Russia due to export sanctions. According to the source, UN diplomats held discussions to re-open the Togliatti-Odesa pipeline carrying ammonia. President Volodymyr Zelenskiy sought to eliminate the export sanctions in exchange for the release of prisoners of war held by Russia. Russia rejected the offer.

At the 38th meeting of the Standing Committee for Economic and Commercial Cooperation (COMCEC) of the Organization of Islamic Cooperation (OIC) in Istanbul, Erdogan remarked that over 11 million tonnes of grain had been transported through the Black Sea Grain Corridor since the successful implementation of the Black Sea Grain Initiative.

Opinion polling on sanctions by nation

Austria
A July 2022 poll found that 48% of those surveyed support an end to sanctions on Russia, while only 43% are in favor of keeping it.

Hungary
In late 2022, The Hungarian government staged a Public consultation on the public support on EU sanctions.

In January 2023 the government released the results, which found that 97% who took part were against sanctions on Russia. The questions framed the sanctions as decided by Brussels, rather than the Hungarian government.  The questions were introduced with a leading statement :"We believe that the Brussels sanctions are destroying us. Have your say too," rather than the neutral language preferred in polling to minimize bias.

Due to the political rhetoric of the Fidesz government as being publicly opposed to sanctions, a majority of Fidesz voters think that the government has voted against the sanctions. while in reality, they have voted for every sanction package.

Germany
A poll found that 53% of Germans supported sanctions.
A poll conducted between August and September 2022 found 58% in favour of sanctions.
In October 2022, a poll found that 63% of Germans support sanctions, while 30% want to lift them. The poll also found that 48% of East Germans and 82% AFD supporters were more likely to support getting rid of sanctions. This shows hostility to sanctions is concentrated in East Germany and among far-right supporters, with higher support for sanctions and restrictions of Russia's ability to prosecute the war in West Germany and the rest of the political spectrum.

Japan
A poll conducted in March 2022 found 86% in favour of sanctions.

Serbia
A 2022 June poll found that over 80% of Serbians were opposed to sanctions on Russia. A July 2022 poll found that 84% were opposed. Serbia has not imposed significant sanctions.

Spain
A poll conducted between August and September 2022 found 69% in favour of sanctions.

Sweden
A poll conducted between August and September 2022 found 71% in favour of sanctions.

Switzerland
According to a 2022-security survey, 77% of Swiss feel it is right for Switzerland to support sanctions against Russia.

United Kingdom
A March 2022 poll found that 78% of respondents supported sanctions against Russia for their invasion of Ukraine

United States
In February 2022, a Washington Post-ABC News poll found that 67% of people said they supported sanctions, while 20% were opposed and 13% said they had no opinion.

A February 2022 Ipsos poll found that 69% supported sanctions. 

A May 2022 ABC Poll found that 67% of Americans supported increasing sanctions on Russia, while 22% were opposed.

See also
 
 
 
 
 
 
 
 
 
 
 
 
 United States sanctions
 Specially Designated Nationals and Blocked Persons List

Notes

References 

+2022
2022 in economics
2022 in international relations
Articles containing video clips
Foreign relations of Russia
Foreign relations of Ukraine
International sanctions
Reactions to the 2022 Russian invasion of Ukraine
Russo-Ukrainian War
Russian invasion of Ukraine